Georgina Harding is an English author of fiction. Published works include her novels The Spy Game (shortlisted for The Encore Award 2011) and Painter of Silence.

She has also written two works of non-fiction: Tranquebar: A Season in South India and In Another Europe. She lives in London and the Stour Valley, Essex.

Bibliography

Non fiction
1990: In Another Europe: A Journey To Romania
1993: Tranquebar: A Season in South India

Fiction
2006: The Solitude of Thomas Cave
2009: The Spy Game
2012: Painter of Silence
2016: The Gun Room
2018: Land of the Living

References 

Year of birth missing (living people)
Living people
English writers
English women novelists